Cambrew Ltd (Angkor Brewery) is the largest brewery in Cambodia, situated in Sihanoukville. The brewery produces Angkor Beer (the most widely consumed beer in the country and acknowledged as Cambodia’s national beer), Klang Beer, Bayon Beer, Angkor Extra Stout and Black Panther Premium Stout.

History
An earlier brewing company, known as SKD Brewery (Société des Khmere Distilleries) was commissioned by the Cambodian Government in the early 1960s and built by a French contractor with technical assistance from France. The brewery was officially opened by HRH Prince Sihanouk in 1965. The brewery building was designed by Cambodia architect Vann Molyvann during the 'golden period' of New Khmer Architecture. The main office building follows the distinctive 'dong raik' architectural design form in which the upper floor overhangs the ground floor by several metres, highlighted and reflected in the shape of the distinctive triangle supports in the facade. Sihanoukville was chosen as the site for the brewery  for the quality of the local water which supposedly had the ideal mineral content for brewing beer. The choice of Sihanoukville was not without controversy at the time due to the distance from the bottle manufacturing plant near Phnom Penh. The brewery  produced lager beer, marketed under the brand names Angkor Beer and Bayon Beer.  The brewery's operations were disrupted when civil war broke out in the early 1970s and closed in 1975.

In 1991 Cambrew Ltd (a Malaysian company) assumed control of the brewery and after nine months of refurbishment, the brewery recommenced production in 1992. In 1992 Cambrew entered into a joint venture with PepsiCo for bottling and distribution of soft drinks in Cambodia.

In 2005 the Carlsberg Group purchased a 50% holding in the brewery. In 2011 the Angkor Extra Stout was awarded the Grand Gold award from Monde Selection of Belgium.

Beers
 Angkor Premium Beer - a Pale Lager (5.0% alc/vol) available in 330ml can, 330ml bottle, and 640ml bottle 
 Angkor Extra Stout - an Extra Stout (8.0% alc/vol) available in 330ml Bottle, and 640ml bottle
 Klang Beer - a strong Lager (6.0% alc/vol) available in 330ml can
 Bayon Beer - a Pale Lager (4.6% alc/vol) available in 330ml can 
 Black Panther Premium Stout - a Stout (8.0% alc/vol) available in 330ml can. It has a strong malt odour.
 Carlsberg Draught - a Pilsner (5.0% alc/vol)

References

External links
Angkor Beer website
 Inside the Angkor Brewery

Beer in Cambodia
Food and drink companies of Cambodia
Sihanoukville (city)
Food and drink companies established in 1991
1991 establishments in Cambodia
PepsiCo bottlers
2005 mergers and acquisitions